Timiaouine is a town and commune in Bordj Badji Mokhtar District, Bordj Baji Mokhtar Province, in southwest Algeria near the border with Mali. According to the 2008 census it has a population of 4,493, up from 4,206 in 1998, with an annual growth rate of 0.7%, the lowest rate in the province.

Geography

The area is notable for large granite boulders that are found immediately to the west, and also further to the north, of the town.

Climate

Timiaouine has a hot desert climate (Köppen climate classification BWh), with extremely hot summers and mild winters, and very little precipitation throughout the year.

Transportation

The only major road out of Timiaouine is the N6 national highway, which connects the city to Bordj Badji Mokhtar to the northwest and then Adrar to the north.

Education

0.4% of the population has a tertiary education (the lowest rate for any commune in Bordj Baji Mokhtar Province), and another 2.3% has completed secondary education. The overall literacy rate is 63.5%, and is 70.9% among males and 56.0% among females.

Localities
As of 1984, the commune was composed of one locality:
Timiaouine

References 

Neighbouring towns and cities

Communes of Adrar Province